Milton Thaiday (born 15 February 1980) is a former Torres Strait Islander rugby league player for the Newcastle Knights in the National Rugby League competition.

He is a cousin of Sam of the Brisbane Broncos. In the 2005 season he scored 7 tries in 14 appearances.

Milton suffered a season ending shoulder injury in round 5 and missed the remainder of the 2007 campaign.

In the 2007 season Milton did not feature much for The Knights as he was battling injury, with coach Brian Smith preferring utility Kurt Gidley at fullback over the explosive Thaiday. Thaiday retired at the end of the 2007 season.

Rugby union career
Thaiday played Super 14 Rugby for the New South Wales Waratahs, scoring a try when the Waratahs played the Pacific Islanders in June 2004.

Career highlights 
Junior Club: Brothers Townsville
Career Stats: 2005–2007 Milton Thaiday played 29 games, scored 14 tries for a total of 56 points
He initially began his professional career in rugby union playing for the NSW Waratahs in Super 12 Rugby. He was discovered by rugby great Mark Ella while playing in a local competition at Lismore, northern NSW.

References 

1980 births
Living people
Australian rugby league players
Australian rugby union players
Central Charlestown Butcher Boys players
Footballers who switched code
Indigenous Australian rugby league players
Indigenous Australian rugby union players
Newcastle Knights players
Rugby league fullbacks
Rugby league players from Townsville
Rugby union players from Queensland